Sankar Montoute is a former linebacker in the National Football League. He played with the Tampa Bay Buccaneers during the 1987 NFL season.

Early life
Montoute attended the St. John's Military Academy in Delafield, Wisconsin.

References

People from Delafield, Wisconsin
Players of American football from Wisconsin
Tampa Bay Buccaneers players
American football linebackers
Wisconsin Badgers football players
Saint Leo University alumni
1961 births
Living people
National Football League replacement players